Non-binary and genderqueer are umbrella terms for gender identities that are not solely male or femaleidentities that are outside the gender binary. Non-binary identities fall under the transgender umbrella, since non-binary people typically identify with a gender that is different from their assigned sex, though some non-binary people do not consider themselves transgender.

Non-binary people may identify as an intermediate or separate third gender, identify with more than one gender, no gender, or have a fluctuating gender identity. Gender identity is separate from sexual or romantic orientation: non-binary people have various sexual orientations. Being non-binary is also not the same as being intersex; most intersex people identify as either male or female.

Non-binary people as a group vary in their gender expressions, and some may reject gender identity altogether. Some non-binary people are medically treated for gender dysphoria with surgery or hormones, as trans men and trans women often are.

Terms, definitions, and identities

The term genderqueer originated in queer zines of the 1980s as a precursor to the term non-binary. It gained wider use in the 1990s among political activists, especially Riki Anne Wilchins. Wilchins used the term in a 1995 essay published in the first issue of In Your Face to describe anyone who is gender nonconforming, and identified as genderqueer in their 1997 autobiography. Wilchins was also one of the main contributors to the anthology Genderqueer: Voices Beyond the Sexual Binary published in 2002. The internet allowed the term genderqueer to spread even further than zines, and by the 2010s the term was introduced to the mainstream via celebrities who publicly identified under the genderqueer umbrella.

People who challenge binary social constructions of gender often self-identify as genderqueer. In addition an umbrella term for non-binary gender identities, genderqueer has been used as an adjective to refer to people who are perceived to transcend or diverge from traditional distinctions of gender, regardless of their gender identity. People may express gender non-normatively by not conforming into the binary gender categories of "man" and "woman".

The term genderqueer has also been applied by those describing what they see as gender ambiguity. Androgynous (also androgyne) is frequently used as a descriptive term for people in this category. This is because the term androgyny is closely associated with a blend of socially defined masculine and feminine traits. Not all genderqueer people identify as androgynous; some identify as a masculine woman or a feminine man, or combine genderqueer with another gender option. Some people use enby (from the letters NB) as a short form of non-binary. Being non-binary is not the same as being intersex, and most intersex people identify as either male or female.

Many references use the term transgender to include genderqueer/non-binary people. This use of the word as a broad term for various kinds of gender variation dates to at least 1992 and the publication of Leslie Feinberg's Transgender Liberation: A Movement Whose Time Has Come. In 1994, non-binary author Kate Bornstein wrote, "All the categories of transgender find a common ground in that they each break one or more of the rules of gender: What we have in common is that we are gender outlaws, every one of us." The Human Rights Campaign Foundation and Gender Spectrum use the term gender-expansive to convey "a wider, more flexible range of gender identity and/or expression than typically associated with the binary gender system".

 people ("a-" meaning "without"), also called genderless, gender-free, non-gendered, or ungendered, are those who identify as having no gender or gender identity. This category includes a broad range of identities that do not conform to traditional gender norms, but scholar Finn Enke has said that people who identify with any of these positions may not necessarily self-identify as transgender. Agender people have no specific set of pronouns; singular they is typically used, but it is not the default. Neutrois and agender were two of 50 available custom genders added to Facebook in February 2014. Agender has also been a gender option on OkCupid since November 2014.

Bigender (also bi-gender or dual gender) people have two gender identities and behaviors. Identifying as bigender is typically understood to mean that one identifies as both male and female or moves between masculine gender expression and feminine gender expression, having two distinct gender identities simultaneously or fluctuating between them. This is different from identifying as genderfluid, as those who identify as genderfluid may not go back and forth between any fixed gender identities and may experience an entire range or spectrum of identities over time. The American Psychological Association calls bigender identity part of the umbrella of transgender identities. Some bigender people express two distinct personas, which may be feminine, masculine, agender, androgyne, or other gender identities; others find that they identify as two genders simultaneously. A 1999 survey conducted by the San Francisco Department of Public Health observed that, among the transgender community, 3% of those who were assigned male at birth and 8% of those assigned female at birth identified as either "a transvestite, cross-dresser, drag queen, or a bigendered person". A 2016 Harris poll conducted on behalf of GLAAD found that 1% of millennials identify as bigender. Trigender people shift among male, female, and third gender.

 people identify partially or mostly with one gender and at the same time with another gender. There are several subcategories of the identity. A demi-boy or demi-man, for example, identifies at least partially with being a boy or a man (no matter the sex and gender they were assigned at birth) and partly with other genders or with no other gender (agender). A demiflux person feels that the stable part of their identity is non-binary.

 (also polygender or omnigender) people have multiple gender identities. Some may identify as all genders simultaneously.

Genderfluid people often express a desire to remain flexible about their gender identity rather than committing to a single definition. They may fluctuate among differing gender expressions over their lifetime, or express multiple aspects of various gender markers at the same time. A genderfluid person may also identify as bigender, trigender, or pangender.

Transfeminine is a term for any person, binary or non-binary, who was assigned male at birth and has a predominantly feminine gender identity or presentation; transmasculine is the equivalent term for someone who was assigned female at birth and has a predominantly masculine gender identity or presentation.

In a 1990 Indigenous LGBT gathering in Winnipeg, the term two-spirit, which refers to third-gender or gender-variant people from Indigenous North American communities, was created "to distinguish and distance Native American/First Nations people from non-Native peoples".

 is an umbrella term for gender identities that are described with terms outside standard human understandings of gender. These gender identities are typically defined metaphorically in relation to animals, plants, things or sensory characteristics rather than male or female.

History

Non-binary gender has been included within the third gender concept, but the history of identities now classified as third gender extends beyond that of nonbinary gender in particular.

In 1776, the Public Universal Friend identified as a genderless evangelist, and afterward shunned both birth name and gendered pronouns, an early instance of an American publicly identifying as non-binary.

In 1781, Jens Andersson of Norway, assigned female at birth but identifying as male, was imprisoned and put on trial after getting married to Anne Kristine Mortensdotter in a Lutheran church. When asked about his gender, the response was "Hand troer at kunde henhøre til begge Deele" ("He believes he belongs to both").

In 1990, the American gender theorist and philosopher Judith Butler published their book Gender Trouble, questioning both the naturalness and the exclusive dichotomy of the male/female binary. Gender Trouble concludes by arguing that expanding cultural understandings of sex and gender contradict the idea of sex and gender as binaries and reveals these binaries as unnatural. Butler has publicly identified as non-binary since 2019. They use they/them and she/her pronouns, but prefer the former.

In the mid-1990s, the term "gender queer" emerged in connection with the American transgender rights activist Riki Wilchins, who in 2002 co-edited a collection of articles, GenderQueer: Voices from beyond the Sexual Binary. Wilchins used the expression as early as 1995 in the In Your Face newsletter to argue against gender discrimination. In 1997, Wilchins announced they identify as genderqueer in their autobiography. In 2017, they published a collection of articles titled Burn the Binary!

In 1997, autism-rights movement activist Jim Sinclair, one of the founders of Autism Network International (ANI), publicly declared themself gender-neutral, writing, "I remain openly and proudly neuter, both physically and socially" in their 1997 self-introduction to the Intersex Society of North America.

In Japan, the expression "X-gender" has been used since the late 1990s as a definition of gender outside of the binary of male and female. Notable people identifying as X-gender include manga artists Yūki Kamatani and Yuu Watase.

In 2012, the Intersex & Genderqueer Recognition Project began to advocate for expanding gender options on official documentation. In 2016, Elisa Rae Shupe was the first person to have a non-binary gender on official U.S. documents.

In 2015, legislator Estefan Cortes-Vargas came out as non-binary in the Legislative Assembly of Alberta during a debate over the inclusion of transgender rights in the provincial human rights code.

Pronouns and titles

Some non-binary or genderqueer people use gender-neutral pronouns. In English, usage of singular "they", "their" and "them" is the most common; nonstandard pronouns—commonly called neopronouns—such as xe, ze, sie, co, and ey are sometimes used as well. Some others use the conventional gender-specific pronouns "he" or "she", alternate between "he" and "she", or use only their name and no pronouns at all. Many use additional neutral language, such as the title Mx.

A 2015 National Center for Transgender Equality study surveyed nearly 28,000 transgender people in the United States, 35% of whom identified as non-binary or genderqueer. 84% of respondents reported using pronouns that did not match the gender given on their birth certificates. 37% of respondents preferred he/him, 37% preferred she/her, and 29% preferred they/them. 20% of respondents did not ask others to use certain pronouns to refer to them, and 4% used pronouns not given in the survey choices.

Legal recognition

Many non-binary/genderqueer people use the gender they were given at birth to conduct everyday business, as many institutions and forms of identification—such as passports and driver's licenses—only accept, in the sense of recorded recognition, binary gender identities. But with the increasing acceptance of non-binary gender identities and the rise in wider societal recognition, this is slowly changing, as more governments and institutions recognize and allow non-binary identities.

Multiple countries legally recognize non-binary or third gender classifications. Some non-Western societies have long recognized transgender people as a third gender, though this may not (or may only recently) include formal legal recognition. In Western societies, Australia may have been the first country to legally recognize a classification of sex outside of "male" and "female" on legal documentation, with the recognition of Alex MacFarlane's intersex status in 2003. The wider legal recognition of non-binary people—following the recognition of intersex people in 2003—in Australian law followed between 2010 and 2014, with legal action taken against the New South Wales Government Registry of Births, Deaths and Marriages by transgender activist Norrie May-Welby to recognize Norrie's legal gender identity as "non-specific". India's Supreme Court formally recognized transgender and non-binary people as a distinct third gender in 2014, following legal action taken by transgender activist Laxmi Narayan Tripathi. In July 2021, Argentina incorporated non-binary gender in its national ID card, becoming the first country in South America to legally recognize non-binary gender on all official documentation; non-binary people in the country will have the option to renew their ID with the letter "X" under gender.

While the United States does not federally recognize a non-binary gender, in 2016 Oregon became the first state to recognize a non-binary gender identity. In 2017, California passed an act allowing citizens to identify as "non-binary" on official documents. As of 2019, eight states have passed acts that allow "non-binary" or "X" designations on certain identifying documents. One of the main arguments against the inclusion of a third gender identifier in the U.S. is that it would make law enforcement and surveillance harder, but countries that have officially recognized a third gender marker have not reported these issues. In the U.S. there are no explicit laws to protect non-binary people from discrimination, but under Title VII of the Civil Rights Act of 1964, it is illegal for an employer to require employees to conform to gender stereotypes, or to fire them merely for being transgender.

Discrimination

Various countries throughout history have criminalized transgender and non-binary gender identities.

In the U.S., 13% of respondents to the 2008 National Transgender Discrimination Survey chose "A gender not listed here". The "not listed here" respondents were 9 percentage points more likely to report forgoing healthcare due to fear of discrimination than the general sample (36% compared to 27%). 90 percent reported experiencing anti-trans bias at work, and 43 percent reported having attempted suicide.

The reported discrimination non-binary people face includes disregard, disbelief, condescending interactions, and disrespect. Non-binary people are also often viewed as partaking in a trend and thus deemed insincere or attention-seeking. As an accumulation, erasure is often a significant form of discrimination non-binary people face.

Misgendering, intentional or not, is also a problem that many face. In the case of intentional misgendering, transphobia is a driving force. Additionally, the use of they/them pronouns is lumped into the larger, controversial, subject of safe spaces and political correctness, causing pushback and intentional misgendering by some people.

Non-binary and transgender identifying people also face discrimination in sports participation. Non-binary identifying athletes have an immediate barrier as most sports competitions are divided into men's and women's categories.

Symbols and observances

Many flags have been used in non-binary and genderqueer communities to represent various identities. There are distinct non-binary and genderqueer pride flags. The genderqueer pride flag was designed in 2011 by Marilyn Roxie. Lavender represents androgyny or queerness, white represents agender identity, and green represents those whose identities which are defined outside the binary. The non-binary pride flag was created in 2014 by Kye Rowan. Yellow represents people whose gender exists outside the binary, purple represents those whose gender is a mixture of—or between—male and female, black represents people who have no gender, and white represents those who embrace many or all genders.

Genderfluid people, who fall under the genderqueer umbrella, also have their own flag. Pink represents femininity, white represents lack of gender, purple represents mixed gender or androgyny, black represents all other genders, and blue represents masculinity.

Agender people, who also sometimes identify as genderqueer, have their own flag. This flag uses black and white stripes to represent an absence of gender, and a green stripe to represent non-binary genders.

International Non-Binary People's Day is celebrated on 14 July. Other observances with non-binary participation include International Transgender Day of Visibility, observed on 31 March, and International Day Against Homophobia, Biphobia, and Transphobia, observed on 17 May.

Population figures

Brazil
A 2021 survey published in Scientific Reports concluded that 1.19% of Brazilian adults are non-binary, but the study did not ask whether they self-identified as non-binary. Because the authors considered most Brazilians unfamiliar with North American gender terminology, more open-ended questions about gender were asked.

Canada
In April 2022, Statistics Canada released findings from the 2021 census, making Canada the first country to ask a core question about gender identity, and found that 41,355 Canadians aged 15 and over identified as nonbinary.

A 2019 survey of the Two-Spirit and LGBTQ+ population in Hamilton, Ontario, called Mapping the Void: Two-Spirit and LGBTQ+ Experiences in Hamilton showed that 19% of the 906 respondents identified as non-binary.

A 2017 survey of Canadian LGBT+ people called LGBT+ Realities Survey found that 4% of the 1,897 respondents identified as non-binary transgender and 1% identified as non-binary outside of the transgender umbrella.

Switzerland
A 2021 survey found that 0.4% of adults in Switzerland describe themselves as non-binary. The survey of 2,690 Swiss residents was weighted to be reflective of the entire population.

United Kingdom
A 2011 survey conducted by the Equality and Human Rights Commission in the UK found that 0.4% of the 10,039 respondents identified as non-binary. It does not allow inference about the share of non-binary people in the whole population, since the survey sample was not necessarily representative. The purpose of the survey was to test if respondents are willing to answer questions about their transgender identity. Census data from 2021 indicates that 0.5% of people don't identify with the sex they were assigned with at birth.

United States
According to a 2021 study by the Williams Institute, an estimated 1.2 million American adults aged between 18 and 60 identify as non-binary, making up 11% of the LGBTQ population in that age bracket.

A 2020 survey by The Trevor Project found that 26% of LGBTQ youth (ages 13–24) in the U.S. identify as non-binary.

According to The Report of the 2015 U.S. Transgender Survey, 35% of the nearly 28,000 transgender respondents to the anonymous online survey identified as non-binary.

See also

 Genderqueer fashion
 Gender neutrality
 Gender-neutral language
 Gender neutrality in languages with grammatical gender
 Gender neutrality in genderless languages
 Gender neutrality in English
 Gender marking in job titles
 Gender-specific and gender-neutral pronouns
 Gender transitioning
 Gender variance
 List of fictional non-binary characters
 List of people with non-binary gender identities
 Postgenderism
 Queer heterosexuality
 Transcending Boundaries Conference
 Two-Spirit

Explanatory notes

References

Further reading

 Barker, Meg-John; Scheele, Julia (2016). Queer: A Graphic History. London: Icon Books. . .
 
 
 
 
 
 
 
 Richards, C., Bouman, W. P., & Barker, M.-J. (2017). Genderqueer and non-binary genders. London: Palgrave Macmillan. . .

External links
 
 

 
Gender identity
Feminist terminology
Neologisms
Third gender
Transgender identities